Susan Smythe Kung is the Manager of the Archive of the Indigenous Languages of Latin America at the LLILAS Benson Latin American Studies and Collections at the University of Texas at Austin. Kung is a linguist who specializes in endangered language archiving and the Huehuetla Tepehua language of Hidalgo, Mexico. She earned her doctorate in linguistics in 2007 from the University of Texas at Austin, and her dissertation, A Descriptive Grammar of Huehuetla Tepehua won the Mary R. Haas Book Award from the Society for the Study of the Indigenous Languages of the Americas. Kung is the President of DELAMAN, the Digital Endangered Languages and Music Archiving Network from 2016-2018 and is a founding member of the Linguistics Data Interest Group (LDIG) of the Research Data Alliance.

Selected publications 
 Berez-Kroeker, Andrea L., Lauren Gawne, Susan Smythe Kung, Barbara F. Kelly, Tyler Heston, Gary Holton, Peter Pulsifer, David I. Beaver, Shobhana Chelliah, Stanley Dubinsky, Richard P. Meier, Nick Thieberger, Keren Rice and Anthony C. Woodbury. 2018. Reproducible research in linguistics: A position statement on data citation and attribution in our field. Linguistics 56(1): 1-18. https://doi.org/10.1515/ling-2017-0032
 Berez-Kroeker, A. L., H.N. Andreassen, L. Gawne, G. Holton, S.S. Kung, P.  Pulsifer, L.B. Collister, The Data Citation and Attribution in Linguistics Group, and the Linguistics Data Interest Group. (2017). Draft: The Austin Principles of Data Citation in Linguistics (Version 0.1).  http://site.uit.no/linguisticsdatacitation/austinprinciples/ Accessed 1/17/2018
 Kung, Susan Smythe and Joel Sherzer. 2013. "The Archive of the Indigenous Languages of Latin America: An Overview." Oral Tradition, 28/2 (pp. 379–388).
 Kung, Susan Smythe. 2012. "Los compadres. Cuento en Tepehua de Huehuetla [The compadres. A story in Huehuetla Tepehua.]." In Paulette Levy and David Beck (eds.), Las lenguas totonacos y tepehuas. Textos y otros materiales para su estudio [The Totonac and Tepehua languages. Texts and other materials for their study]. Mexico City: UNAM,  pp. 55–77.
 Kung, Susan Smythe. 2012. "Los dos hermanos. Cuento en Tepehua de Huehuetla [The two brothers. A story in Huehuetla Tepehua.]." In Paulette Levy and David Beck (eds.), Las lenguas totonacos y tepehuas. Textos y otros materiales para su estudio [The Totonac and Tepehua languages. Texts and other materials for their study]. Mexico City: UNAM, pp. 78–96.

References

External links 

 Huehuetla Tepehua Collection of Susan Smythe Kung

Year of birth missing (living people)
Living people
Linguists from the United States
Women linguists